Frederick Sidney Cotton OBE (17 June 1894 – 13 February 1969) was an Australian inventor, photographer and aviation and photography pioneer, responsible for developing and promoting an early colour film process, and largely responsible for the development of photographic reconnaissance before and during World War II.  He numbered among his close friends George Eastman, Ian Fleming and Winston Churchill.

Early years
Frederick Sidney Cotton was born on 17 June 1894 on a cattle station at Goorganga, near Proserpine, Queensland. He was the third child of Alfred and Annie Cotton, who were involved in pastoralism. Cotton was educated at The Southport School in Queensland and later in 1910, he and his family went to England, where he attended Cheltenham College; however the family returned to Australia in 1912. Cotton worked as a jackeroo, training to work with livestock at stations in New South Wales up until the outbreak of war.

First World War
Cotton went back to England to join the Royal Naval Air Service in November 1915. After only five hours solo flying, he qualified as a combat pilot, and initially flew Channel patrols. Cotton went on to participate in night bombing sorties over France and Germany with Nos 3 and 5 Wings. His experience with high level and low-temperature flying led Cotton in 1917 to develop the revolutionary new "Sidcot" suit, a flying suit which solved the problem pilots had in keeping warm in the cockpit. This flying suit was widely used by the RAF until the 1950s. Cotton continued with No. 8 Squadron RNAS in 1917 where he was promoted to Flight Sub-Lieutenant in June 1917. Soon after, he came into conflict with senior officers, and resigned his commission in October 1917.

Between the wars
After leaving military service, Cotton married in London a 17-year-old actress, Regmor Agnes Maclean, in October 1917, with whom he had a son. After the war he spent time in Tasmania, then returned to England, where he continued his passion for flying. In 1920, he embarked on an unsuccessful attempt to fly from England to South Africa, and also made a lucky escape from a crash at the Aerial Derby. Cotton then spent three years working in Newfoundland flying various assignments.

Following the divorce from his first wife the previous year, in 1926, Cotton married 18-year-old Millicent Joan Henry whom he had met in Canada. From this time up until the outbreak of the Second World War, Cotton led a colourful and eventful life; he took part in various business activities, including an airborne seal-spotting service as well as aerial search and rescue operations for lost explorers in Newfoundland and Greenland.

Spy missions
Shortly before the Second World War, Cotton was recruited by Fred Winterbotham (then of MI6) to take clandestine aerial photographs of the German military buildup. Using his status as a wealthy and prominent private aviator currently promoting his film business (and using a series of other subterfuges including taking on the guise of an archaeologist or a film producer looking for locations), a series of flights provided valuable information about German naval activity and troop buildups. He equipped the civilian Lockheed 12A business aircraft, G-AFTL, with three F24 cameras concealed behind panels which could be slid aside and operated by pressing a button under the pilot's seat, and a Leica behind a similar panel in the wings. Warm cabin air was diverted to prevent condensation on optical surfaces. Cotton took his secretary Patricia Martin along, and she too took photographs in flight.  Although his flight plans were dictated by the German government, he consistently managed to get away with flying off-track over military installations. Cotton had a very persuasive manner, and exploited any advantage he could.

In 1939, Cotton took aerial photos during a flight over parts of the Middle East and North Africa. On the eve of war, he even managed to engineer a "joy-ride" over German military airfields on one occasion, accompanied by senior Luftwaffe officer Albert Kesselring. With Kesselring at the controls, Cotton reached under his seat, operated the cameras, and captured the airfield on film.  Cotton later offered to fly Hermann Göring to London for talks a week before outbreak of hostilities, and his was the last civilian aircraft to leave Berlin before the outbreak of hostilities. One biography is titled Sidney Cotton: The Last Plane Out of Berlin commemorating this escapade.

Second World War
Commissioned in the RAF as a substantive Squadron Leader and acting Wing Commander on 22 September 1939, in the same period, Cotton was recruited to head up the fledgling RAF 1 Photographic Development Unit (PDU) at Heston Aerodrome. This unit provided important intelligence leading to successful air raids on key enemy installations. With his experience and knowledge gained over Germany and other overflights, Cotton greatly improved the RAF's photo reconnaissance capabilities.  The PDU was originally equipped with Bristol Blenheims, but Cotton considered these quite unsuitable, being far too slow, and he consequently "wheedled" a couple of Supermarine Spitfires.  These Spitfires, later augmented by de Havilland Mosquitos, were steadily adapted to fly higher and faster, with a highly polished surface, a special blue – "PRU Blue" – camouflage scheme developed by Cotton himself, and a series of modifications to the engines to produce more power at high altitudes. In 1940, Cotton also personally made another important reconnaissance flight with his Lockheed 12A over Azerbaijan via Iraq as part of Operation Pike.

Under his leadership, the 1 PDU acquired the nicknames, "Cotton's Club" or the less flattering "Cotton's Crooks" (mainly due to Cotton's propensity to flout regulations). Cotton revelled in his reputation as unorthodox, and even had a special badge struck bearing the initials "CC-11" that signified the 11th commandment – "Thou shalt not be found out."

Cotton's aerial photographs were far ahead of their time. Together with other members of the 1 PDU, he pioneered the techniques of high-altitude, high-speed stereoscopic photography that were instrumental in revealing the locations of many crucial military and intelligence targets. R.V. Jones recounts in his memoirs how these photographs were used to establish the size and the characteristic launching mechanisms for both the V-1 flying bomb and the V-2 rocket. In December 1943, using the photographs, Constance Babington Smith was the first person to identify a V-1 in an image of a test station in Peenemunde, Germany. Cotton also worked on ideas such as a prototype specialist reconnaissance aircraft and further refinements of photographic equipment.

By mid-1940 however, Cotton had clashed with senior officials in the Air Ministry over his participation in the evacuation of British agents from France under the cover name of "Special Survey Flights." After his return from France couriering Marcel Boussac, the head of the Christian Dior garment and perfume empire, for a fee, he was removed from his post and banned from any involvement with air operations. Following several efforts to be reinstated, even involving Churchill himself, Cotton resigned his commission; he was nevertheless appointed an OBE. For the remainder of the war, Cotton acted as an unofficial consultant to the Admiralty. Under the new designation, 1 Photographic Reconnaissance Unit (PRU), based at RAF Benson, 1 PRU went on to a distinguished wartime record, eventually operating five squadrons out of a number of bases. Succeeding commanding officers would emulate the spirit and innovative techniques pioneered by Cotton.

In September 1940, Cotton's modified Lockheed 12A (G-AFTL), was severely damaged in an air raid at Heston Aerodrome. It was rebuilt by Lockheed, sold in British Honduras, and in 1948 registered in the US as N12EJ; the aircraft resided in Florida in 1992. His postwar Lockheed 12A (G-AGTL) also survives in France in 2005.

In September 1940, Cotton pursued the idea of an airborne searchlight for night-fighters, that he termed "Aerial Target Illumination" (ATI). He enlisted the help of William Helmore, and they jointly took out patents on the techniques (GB574970 and GB575093). Helmore, a serving RAF officer, then sponsored the development of what became known as Turbinlite.

Post-World War II
Like many such "larger-than-life" wartime figures, Cotton did not thrive in post-war civilian life.  He was reluctant to profit from his wartime innovations and even waived his patent rights on the Sidcot suit. While he was sometimes very rich in later life, Cotton was also dogged by bad luck in private business.

Around the time of the Partition of India in 1947, Cotton was hired by the independent princely state of Hyderabad to assist it in resisting integration into the Dominion of India. At the request of Prince Mohammed Bakhtawar Khan and his son Prince Mumtaz Ali Khan – representatives of Osman Ali Khan (Nizam of Hyderabad) – Cotton transported gold reserves for the Dominion of Pakistan, which was an ally of the Nizam. During the first India-Pakistan War, Cotton undertook airlifts of weapons, supplies and medicines from Hyderabad to Pakistan, using unarmed Avro Lancastrian transport aircraft. Hyderabadi forces were defeated in September 1948 and the Nizam surrendered. Cotton later faced charges of gun running under the UK Air Navigation Act, was convicted and fined £200.

Thelma "Bunty" Brooke-Smith, a former secretary, married Cotton in 1951, becoming his third wife. With Bunty, Cotton was to have another son and daughter.

There were erroneous reports of Cotton's death in 1955, following an article in Flight magazine. A subsequent issue reported: "MR. F. SIDNEY COTTON has goodhumouredly   characterised as 'greatly exaggerated' the report of his death, quoted in our issue of 9 September from Australian sources. Apparently there was confusion with the name of a relative [viz. Frank Cotton] who was concerned with the design of aircrew pressure suits. Mr. Sidney Cotton, whose name is associated with the Sidcot flying suit, is in this country, and very much alive."

Cotton later worked in oil exploration and civil engineering.

During the late 1960s, he collaborated with a biographer, Ralph Barker, on a book entitled Aviator Extraordinary: the Sidney Cotton story.

Cotton was living at Ford Manor, Lingfield when he died on 13 February 1969 aged 74. He was cremated following a service at Dormansland Parish Church on 17 February.

Cotton was later memorialised in the name of the Sidney Cotton Bridge, on the O'Connell River, south of Proserpine, Queensland.

See also
Frank Cotton

References

Notes

Citations

Bibliography

 Babington Smith, Constance. Evidence in Camera: The Story of Photographic Intelligence in the Second World War. Stroud, UK: Sutton Publishing 2004, First edition 1957. .
 Ciampaglia, Giuseppe: "Il Lockheed 12-A Electra Junior capostipite degli aerei-spia americani" (in Italian). Rivista Italiana Difesa gennaio, 2002.
 Cotton, Sidney as told to Ralph Barker. Aviator Extraordinary: The Sidney Cotton Story. London: Chatto & Windus, 1969. .
 The Last Plane Out of Berlin (telefilm documentary).  Sydney, Australia: Jeff Watson Productions, 2004.
 Nesbit, Roy Conyers. Eyes of the RAF: A History of Photo-Reconnaissance. Stroud, UK: Sutton Publishing, 1996. 
 Watson, Jeff. Sidney Cotton: The Last Plane Out of Berlin.  Sydney, Australia: Hodder Headline Australia, 2004. .

External links
 Sidney Cotton: The Lockheed file
 Peppers Hidden Vale – Getaway Fact sheets – Home of Sidney Cotton
 Ipswich's "James Bond" remembered on birthday
 Australian Biography Online
 Enigmatic Man

1894 births
1969 deaths
Australian photographers
Australian World War II pilots
Royal Air Force officers
Aerial reconnaissance pioneers
People educated at the Southport School
Australian Officers of the Order of the British Empire